The Caesar Park Hotel Banqiao is a skyscraper hotel completed in 2017 in Banqiao District, New Taipei, Taiwan.

The Hotel

The exterior of the hotel is designed to resemble a large sky lantern in the Taiwan Lantern Festival to symbolize the image of hope and prosperity. The hotel has a total of 400 rooms including premium suites, themed restaurants, one café and a bar. It also offers a pillar-less, 7-meter high banquet hall as well as a rooftop outdoor infinity pool with a view overlooking Greater Taipei, a gym and prestige lounge. The hotel was the first Five star hotel in New Taipei City.

Restaurants & Bars 
 Bon appetit Buffet Restaurant: Buffet offering cuisines from around the globe, including Japanese cuisine and Italian cuisine.
 JIA YAN Chinese Restaurant: Chinese restaurant featuring traditional authentic Taiwanese cuisine.
 Carrara Restaurant: Restaurant offering Mediterranean cuisines from France, Spain, Italy and Greece.
 Lobby Bar: Coffee shop offering light meals, beverages in the daytime and transforms into a bar at night.
 SKY 32: Rooftop bar featuring a view of the city's skyline.

See also
 Caesar Metro Taipei
 Mandarin Oriental, Taipei
 Caesar Park Taipei
 Grand Mayfull Hotel Taipei

References

External links
Caesar Park Hotel Banqiao Official Website 
Caesar Park Hotel Banqiao - Tourism Bureau of the Ministry of Transport of the Republic of China 

2017 establishments in Taiwan
Skyscraper hotels in Taiwan
Hotels in New Taipei
Skyscrapers in New Taipei
Hotel buildings completed in 2017